The 2012–13 season was Villarreal Club de Fútbol's 90th season in existence and the club's first season back in the second division of Spanish football following relegation at the end of the 2011–12 La Liga season. In addition to the domestic league, Villarreal participated in this season's edition of the Copa del Rey. The season covered the period from 1 July 2012 to 30 June 2013.

Review and events

Pre-season and friendlies

Competitions

Overall record

Segunda División

League table

Results summary

Results by round

Matches

Copa del Rey

Second round

Squad

Squad, matches played and goals scored

The numbers are established according to the official website: and www.lfp.es

Out on loan

Minutes played

Bookings

Transfers

In

Out

Loan out

Sources

Villarreal CF
Villarreal CF seasons